Sirene (/) also known as "white brine sirene" is a type of brined cheese made in the Balkans (South-Eastern Europe), especially popular in Bulgaria, Serbia, Montenegro, Bosnia and Herzegovina, North Macedonia, Romania, Albania, Greece and also in Israel and Lebanon. It is made of the milk of goats, sheep, cows, buffalo or a mixture of these. It is slightly crumbly, with at least 46–48% of dry matter containing 44–48% of fat. It is commonly produced in blocks, and has a slightly grainy texture. It is used as a table cheese, in salads, and in baking.

Recipes
Sirene, together with yogurt, is a national food of all the countries in the Balkans, with many national and regional variations. 

Traditional dishes using sirene are:

Soups: Potato or vegetable soup with sirene (сиренява чорба). 

Salads: Shopska salad with tomatoes, bell peppers, cucumbers, onions and sirene. Ovcharska salad ("shepherd's salad") with the above-mentioned vegetables, cheese, ham, boiled eggs and olives. Tomatoes with sirene is a traditional light salad during the summer.

Eggs: Fried eggs and omelettes with sirene. There is also a popular kind of boiled eggs over mashed sirene with a sauce of yogurt, garlic, parsley and walnuts (яйца по панагюрски; eggs à la Panagyurishte).

Pasta and cornmeal: For breakfast, macaroni or flat noodles (Bulgarian: "юфка, yufka") with sirene and sugar are popular. Kachamak (the local variant of cornmeal, polenta or the Romanian mămăligă) is always eaten with sirene.

Pastry: The traditional banitsa and other kinds of pastry are also made with sirene.

Stuffed peppers are more often stuffed with rice, but are also made with sirene-and-eggs filling.

Also it is consumed as an appetizer.

Similar cheeses in other countries 
Many Balkan and other cheeses are similar to (but not the same as) sirene, and are known by various names. The local consumers of each country are usually well aware of the differences between the various white cheeses. Part of the differences are that the breeds of sheep and goats in each region are different, and their feed may have specific regional characteristics that affect the taste and texture of cheese made from their milk.

 Albania: djathë i bardhë - 'white cheese'
 Czech Republic: Balkánský sýr - 'Balkan cheese'
 Greece: Feta - Protected Designation of Origin (PDO)
 Iran: Lighvan or Tabrizi paneer - 'Cheese of Lighvan or Tabriz'
 Israel: Bulgarit (בולגרית) - 'Bulgarian (cheese)'
 Lebanon: Bulghari (بلغاري) - 'Bulgarian (cheese)'
 Mexico: Cotija cheese
 Romania: Telemea
 Russia: Bryndza (Брынза)
 Turkey: Beyaz peynir - 'white cheese'
 Ukraine: Bryndza (бринза)

See also

 Kashkaval
 List of cheeses

References

Albanian cheeses
Bulgarian cheeses
Serbian cheeses
Sheep's-milk cheeses
Cow's-milk cheeses
Lebanese cuisine
Iranian cuisine
Israeli cuisine